The Andalusian, is a Spanish breed of domestic donkey. It is native to the province of Córdoba in Andalusia, and may also be known as the Asno Cordobés ("Cordovan donkey") after the city of Córdoba or the Asno de Lucena ("Lucena donkey") because of its alleged origin in the town of Lucena, Córdoba. It is an endangered breed, and is classified by the Ministerio de Agricultura, Pesca y Alimentación, the Spanish agriculture ministry, as an "autochthonous breed in danger of extinction".

History 

The breed was considered the most prized in the eighteenth century, and the Spanish crown would not permit them to leave the country; however, King Charles III sent two males (jacks) to U.S. President George Washington in 1785. Only one jack survived the sea journey to Mount Vernon, and was named "Royal Gift".

Characteristics 

The Andalusian is a large donkey, averaging  at the withers, and of medium length. The head is of medium size, with a convex profile; the neck is muscular. The coat is short and fine, and soft to the touch; it is pale grey, sometimes almost white. The Andalusian is strong and sturdy, yet docile and calm. It is well adapted to the hot and arid conditions of its native environment.

Status

The current state of the Andalusian breed is critical. At the end of 2013 the total population was reported at 749, of which almost all were in Andalucia. Conservation plans include sparing use as work animal in the field and the forest (work which can also be done by horses), and use in rural tourism initiatives that have been followed in some places like Mijas (Málaga).

References

Andalusia
Donkey breeds originating in Spain
Donkey breeds